The Thetford Mines Pirates and the Thetford Mines Miners (French: les Pirates (Mineurs) de Thetford Mines) were the names of a Canadian minor league baseball franchise that represented Thetford Mines, Quebec, in the Double-A Eastern League in 1974–75.  The club played at le Stade Bellevue.

After two winning but non-playoff teams as the Sherbrooke Pirates, the team moved to Thetford Mines, located 104 km (65 miles) to the north, for the 1974 season as an affiliate of the namesake Pittsburgh Pirates of Major League Baseball. Led by league All-Star catcher and Most Valuable Player Ken Macha, the future MLB manager, Thetford Mines made the playoffs and defeated the Bristol Red Sox in the semi-finals and the Pittsfield Rangers in the finals to win the Eastern League championship.  But the club drew almost 50,000 fans less than they had in Sherbrooke during the 1973 season. As a result, the MLB Pirates switched their Double-A affiliate to the Shreveport Captains of the Double-A Texas League for 1975.

They were replaced in Thetford Mines by the Milwaukee Brewers for 1975. But the renamed "Miners" finished in seventh place, 22½ games out of a playoff spot, and drew only 16,000 fans all year. The franchise was moved to Williamsport, Pennsylvania, for 1976.

Season-by-season

Notable alumni

Tony Armas
Jim Gantner
Mike Jackson
Ken Macha

Omar Moreno
Willie Randolph
Craig Reynolds
Lenn Sakata

References

External links
Baseball Reference

Baseball teams in Quebec
Defunct baseball teams in Canada
Defunct Eastern League (1938–present) teams
Milwaukee Brewers minor league affiliates
Pittsburgh Pirates minor league affiliates
Sport in Thetford Mines
1974 establishments in Quebec
1975 disestablishments in Quebec
Baseball teams established in 1974
Baseball teams disestablished in 1975